Divide Creek is a short creek near Kicking Horse Pass on the British Columbia/Alberta border (also the border between Yoho National Park and Banff National Park).  After following the Continental Divide of the Americas for a short distance, the creek forks, with one side draining through the Bow River east to Hudson Bay and the Arctic Ocean, and the other side draining west to the Pacific Ocean by way of the Kicking Horse River.

See also
 Committee's Punch Bowl, a lake on the British Columbia/Alberta border 167 km northwest of Divide Creek, which also drains to both sides of the Continental Divide.
 Two Ocean Pass/Parting of the Waters, Wyoming, where Two Ocean Creek divides into Atlantic and Pacific distributaries.

Rivers of British Columbia
Rivers of Alberta
Rivers of the Canadian Rockies
Great Divide of North America
Columbia Valley
Tributaries of Hudson Bay